
The Avia BH-12 was a two-seat sport aircraft built in Czechoslovakia in 1924, the final development of the Avia BH-9 family that had its roots in Avia's first aircraft design, the BH-1. It was a low-wing, braced monoplane intended for sports flying, and featured a redesigned wing that could be folded to allow the aircraft to be towed by road. The wing pivoted around its spar and then folded back, flat against the fuselage sides.

Specifications

See also

References

 
 
 Němeček, V. (1968). Československá letadla. Praha: Naše Vojsko.

1920s Czechoslovakian sport aircraft
BH-12
Single-engined tractor aircraft
Low-wing aircraft
Aircraft first flown in 1924